The Thermodon was a river of ancient Boeotia that rose in Mount Hypatus, and flowed past Teumessus, and emptied into the Asopus near Tanagra.

References

Geography of ancient Boeotia
Rivers of Greece